The 1968 Hofstra Flying Dutchmen football team was an American football team that represented Hofstra University during the 1968 NCAA College Division football season. Hofstra placed sixth in the Middle Atlantic Conference, University Division.

In their 19th year under head coach Howard "Howdy" Myers Jr., the Flying Dutchmen compiled a 5–5 record, but were outscored 171 to 155. Bob Devin, Richie Green and Harry Royle were the team captains. 

Hofstra's 1–3 record against MAC University Division opponents was the second-worst of the division's seven competitors, just half a game ahead of 's 1–4. League member  is listed below both teams on standings tables, but was not eligible for the championship, as it only played one divisional game. 

The Flying Dutchmen played their home games at Hofstra Stadium on the university's Hempstead campus on Long Island, New York.

Schedule

References

Hofstra
Hofstra Pride football seasons
Hofstra Flying Dutchmen football